The 2019–20 SFA South Region Challenge Cup was the 13th edition of the annual cup competition for senior non-league clubs in the central and southern regions of Scotland. This season saw the competition increase to 70 teams despite the demise of Selkirk and withdrawal of Eyemouth United, thanks to the relegation of Berwick Rangers to the Lowland League plus the addition of Glenrothes and Kinnoull to the East of Scotland Football League. 

The defending champions were East Kilbride, who beat Bonnyrigg Rose Athletic 2–1 in the final on 26 May 2019. The competition was won by Dunipace for the first time, beating Broomhill 3–1 in the final, which had been delayed due to the COVID-19 pandemic and took place almost two years after the first round matches.

Format 
The competition featured 70 teams from the Lowland Football League (16), East of Scotland Football League (39), South of Scotland Football League (14), as well as SFA member club Glasgow University of the Caledonian Amateur Football League. The reserve teams of Stirling University, Caledonian Braves, and Stranraer do not take part.

The draw was unseeded, with matches proceeding to extra time and penalties if they are tied after 90 minutes.

Calendar

First round
The first round took place on Saturday 24 August 2019. The draw for the first and second rounds took place at the South of Scotland Football League's AGM on Thursday 30 May 2019. 58 clubs received a bye to the second round, with 12 taking part in the first round.

Second round
The second round took  place on the weekend of Saturday 14 September 2019. The six winners from the first round joined the 58 clubs who received a bye.

Seven days after the draw Kinnoull joined the East of Scotland League following the withdrawal of Eyemouth, and were permitted to take-on their home tie against The Spartans.

Third round
The third round took place on Saturday 12 October 2019.

Draw
The draw for the third round took place on Sunday 15 September 2019 after the final second round match at Palmerston Park.

Matches

Fourth round
The fourth round took place on Saturday 9 November 2019.

Draw

Matches

Quarter-finals
The quarter-finals took place on Saturday 7 March 2020.

Draw
The draw took place at a meeting of the East of Scotland League's board on 27 November 2019.

Matches

Semi-finals
The semi-finals were scheduled to take place on Saturday 4 April 2020, but the matches were postponed due to the COVID-19 pandemic. The semi-final draw was made on 5 August 2020 with no date being scheduled for the matches, until they were rescheduled in December 2020.

Draw

Matches

Final
The final was scheduled to take place on Sunday 24 May 2020, however the match was postponed due to the COVID-19 pandemic until the following year. It was postponed for a second time and later rescheduled to take place early in the 2021–22 season.

BSC Glasgow renamed to Broomhill in July 2021. Both teams played in their away strips.

Route to the final 
Broomhill (BSC Glasgow at the time) received a bye in the first round before they began their campaign away to East of Scotland League Premier Division side Bo'ness United. Fellow Lowland League club Gala Fairydean Rovers were next up, then Preston Athletic of the EOSFL First Division. They won on penalties against eventual Lowland League champions Kelty Hearts shortly before the March 2020 lockdown. Their semi-final took place 7 months later where they knocked out reigning champions East Kilbride.

Dunipace's route to the final saw them defeat fellow East of Scotland League First Division sides Coldstream, Edinburgh United, and Glenrothes, before seeing off Lowland League clubs Bonnyrigg Rose and Caledonian Braves. Their semi-final took place after a delay of 14 months, away to Hill of Beath Hawthorn of the EOSFL Premier Division.

References

2019–20 in Scottish football cups
South Challenge Cup seasons